Admiral Sir  Robert Morley or Robert de Morley, 2nd Baron Morley (c. 1295 – 23, March 1360), was an English Knight and naval officer who served as Admiral of the North four times from  (1339–42, 1348–49, 1350–51 and 1355–56) in the service of King Edward III.

He inherited the title of Earl Marshal of Ireland through marriage to his first wife Hawise Le Marshal in 1316 and retained it until his death in 1360.

Naval career
Robert, Lord Morley was one of the most famous naval officers during the Wars of Scottish Independence and the Hundred Years War. He was appointed Admiral of the Northern Fleet from 1339 to 1343. and commanded the fleet that was part of the English naval forces during the Battle of Sluys. On 26 August 1346 he was present at the Battle of Crécy. From 1348 to 1349 he was appointed joint Admiral of the North with Sir Walter Manny, 1st Baron Manny. From 1350 until 1351 appointed Admiral of the North for the third time. In 1355 he was appointed Constable of the Tower of London. He was appointed for the fourth and last time Admiral of North and administration of the Northern Admiralty  from 1355 to 1356. He died in Burgundy, France on 23 March 1360. Prior to the creation of a single Admiralty Office in 1414 that encompassed all of England. The English Navy was administered through geographical commands or regional Admiralties.

Earl Marshal of Ireland
In 1316 he inherited the title of Earl Marshal of Ireland through his marriage to Hawise Le Marshal whose brother John Marshal, 2nd Baron Marshal died without a successor. He retained the title for life until 1360.

Family
He was the only child of Sir William Morley, 1st Baron Morley, (1270–1300) and Cecily de Mohaut, (1273–1316). His first marriage in 1316 was to Hawise Le Marshal, (1301–1329); who was the daughter of Sir William le Marshal, 1st Lord Marshal, Marshal of Ireland and Christian de Burgh. They had one son Sir William Morley, 3rd Baron Morley. His second marriage was to Joan de Tyes with whom he had two children; Joan de Morley and Sir John Morley. His later grandson was Thomas Morley, 4th Baron Morley.

Footnotes

Bibliography
 Burke, John (1831). A general and heraldic dictionary of the peerages of England, Ireland, and Scotland, extinct, dormant, and in abeyance. England. London: H. Colburn & R. Bentley.
 Cokayne, George Edward (1887). Complete peerage of England, Scotland, Ireland, Great Britain and the United Kingdom. London: George Bell & Sons.
 Rodger, N.A.M. (2004). The safeguard of the sea: a naval history of Britain. 660 to 1649. New York: W.W. Norton. .

14th-century English Navy personnel
English admirals
Barons Morley

1290s births
1360 deaths
Year of birth uncertain